Brian Pala Lima OM (born 25 January 1972) is a Samoan former rugby union player who was inducted into the IRB Hall of Fame in 2011.
He earned the nickname of "The Chiropractor" for his shuddering hits both on and off the pitch that supposedly rearranged the bones of the victim.

National team
Lima was born in Apia, Samoa. He debuted for the Samoa national rugby union team in 1990. He featured in Samoa's famous World Cup win over Wales in 1991, and he was the youngest player at the 1991 Rugby World Cup.

One of Lima's most illuminating moments came in Samoa's match against South Africa in a group match at the 2003 Rugby World Cup. As Springbok fly-half Derick Hougaard leapt up in the air to catch a hospital pass, Lima "dive-tackled" him, sending Hougaard crashing to the ground.

Lima was the first player to appear in five World Cups, his fifth being the 2007 World Cup in France, in which he came on against South Africa in Samoa's first game after 60 minutes. Lima announced that he would retire after the 2007 Rugby World Cup. Michael Jones, the Samoa coach (at that time), announced Lima as the captain for the first game of that year's Pacific Nations Cup. Brian Lima was selected to lead Samoa against Fiji. This game was one of Lima's last games on Samoan soil.

Lima also played for the Samoa national rugby sevens team. He scored 17 tries in various Rugby World Cup Sevens tournaments, ranking him third all-time in career World Cup Sevens tries.

Professional
Lima signed for Munster after an impressive game for the southern hemisphere vs the northern hemisphere in a fundraising game for the 2004 tsunami. However Lima was injured shortly after landing in Ireland and never got to pull on the Munster jersey. He has also played for the Blues, Auckland, the Highlanders, and Secom in Japan. He signed a two-year deal with Bristol starting in the 2005–06 season.

In December 2013 Lima was charged with causing actual bodily harm and being armed with a dangerous weapon after publicly assaulting and injuring his ex-wife. He subsequently resigned as coach of the Samoan national team. In June 2014 he was convicted on five charges and sentenced to two years supervision.

In August 2020 he was appointed head coach of the Samoa national rugby sevens team.

Recognition
Lima was appointed to the Order of Merit of Samoa in the 2014 Samoa Honours and Awards.

References

External links
 
 

1972 births
Living people
World Rugby Hall of Fame inductees
Samoan rugby union players
Rugby union wings
Rugby union centres
Stade Français players
Bristol Bears players
Blues (Super Rugby) players
Sportspeople from Apia
Samoa international rugby union players
Pacific Islanders rugby union players
Samoan expatriate rugby union players
Expatriate rugby union players in New Zealand
Expatriate rugby union players in France
Expatriate rugby union players in Wales
Expatriate rugby union players in Japan
Expatriate rugby union players in Ireland
Expatriate rugby union players in England
Samoan expatriate sportspeople in New Zealand
Samoan expatriate sportspeople in England
Samoan expatriate sportspeople in Japan
Samoan expatriate sportspeople in Ireland
Samoan expatriate sportspeople in France
Samoa international rugby sevens players
Male rugby sevens players
Members of the Order of Merit of Samoa
Samoan expatriate sportspeople in Wales
Ponsonby RFC players
Highlanders (rugby union) players
Auckland rugby union players